Rammey Marsh Lock (No 12) is a lock on the River Lee Navigation at Enfield, London, England. The area adjacent to the lock is known as Rammey Marsh and close to the River Lee Flood Relief Channel.

Etymology 
Rammey Marsh is marked thus on the Ordnance Survey map of 1887, named from Ramhey 1538, Rammey 1610, probably 'island (of dry ground in marsh) where rams are pastured', from Old English ramm and ēg.

History 

The lock and the adjoining cut are of 1864. Across the lock tail, a reused cast- iron footbridge dated 1835.

Public access 
Vehicular access only from the north via Lea Valley Walk. Which can be accessed at Lea Road.

Pedestrian and cycle access via the towpath which forms part of the Lea Valley Walk.

Angling is allowed on the River Lee Navigation towpath downstream of Ramney Marsh Lock. Information from the River Lea Anglers Club.

Public transport 
Nearest station Enfield Lock or Waltham Cross

External links 
 London's canals- Rammey Marsh Lock footbridge 
 Rammey Marsh
 Rammey Marsh Lock- a history

References 

Enfield, London
Locks of London
Geography of the London Borough of Enfield
Locks of the Lee Navigation